On 17 December 2018, the bodies of Louisa Vesterager Jespersen, a 24-year-old Danish woman, and Maren Ueland, a 28-year-old Norwegian woman, were found decapitated in the foothills of Mount Toubkal near to the village of Imlil in the Atlas Mountains of Morocco.

A total of 18 men have been arrested by Moroccan Police in relation to the murders. The murders were described by the Moroccan general prosecutor as a terrorist act, after a video of several of the suspects were shown swearing allegiance to the Islamic State of Iraq and the Levant while decapitating Jespersen was released on the Internet.

Background 

Louisa Vesterager Jespersen (born 1994) grew up in Ikast, Denmark. She had been travelling to various different countries, such as Argentina, Peru, and Norway. Jespersen applied for participation in Fjällräven Polar expedition in 2017 and 2018.

Maren Ueland (born 1990) was from Bryne, Norway.

Jespersen and Ueland were students at the University of South-Eastern Norway, where they studied outdoor recreation and nature guidance to become tour guides. The pair had arrived in Morocco on 9 December as tourists, with the intention of trekking and "chasing experiences", according to Jespersen's mother. The two women first arrived in Marrakesh, before travelling to Imlil in the Atlas Mountains. The village of Imlil is popular with travellers as the main base for summiting Toubkal, which is the highest peak in North Africa.

Four attackers had shared a video on social media before the attacks, pledging allegiance to the ISIS terror group, and discussed "destruction caused by the warplanes of the Crusader alliance". One of the attackers stated, "Keep fighting the enemies of Allah, wherever you are, you have no excuse and, be informed that we are your supporters… you have allies among us."

According to Swedish Defence University researcher Magnus Ranstorp, terrorists attacking tourists is not a new phenomenon, and it aims to destabilise the country where such attacks take place.

While Morocco is generally seen as a secure destination for tourists; the last terrorist attack happened in 2011, where 17 people were killed by a bombing at a restaurant in Marrakesh, over 1600 people have travelled from Morocco to join the Islamic State in the Syrian civil war. Moroccan authorities initially ignored the people who joined ISIS, but later on realised they could return to commit terrorist offences in Morocco.

According to a researcher at the Danish Institute for International Studies, "Moroccan authorities appear to have a good grip on the jihadist situation, and cooperate with European and US authorities". Moroccans are overrepresented in "diaspora terrorism", which is terrorism which takes place outside the borders of Morocco; for example, two Moroccans were behind the 2017 London Bridge attack, a Moroccan killed people by driving his van into pedestrians in La Rambla in the 2017 Barcelona terrorist attacks, and the following day, another Moroccan killed two women in the 2017 Turku attack.

Murders and investigation 

On the morning of 17 December 2018, a pair of French hikers came across the decapitated bodies of the victims, and their tent, near a trail connecting Imlil to Mount Toubkal. A suspect named Abderrahim Khayali was quickly apprehended following the incident, after police found an ID in the victims' tent, that had been left behind by the suspect. Three additional suspects, Abdessamad Ejjoud, Rachid Afatti, and Younes Ouaziyad, were later apprehended by the police while riding a bus during the morning rush hour in the nearby city of Marrakesh. The three suspects were caught in possession of bladed weapons. Abdessamad Ejjoud is assumed to be the leader of the group, and the four men had shot a video the week before the murders, where they pledged allegiance to ISIS.

The killers had agreed to carry out a terrorist act on either security services or foreign tourists, before deciding to travel to the Imlil region to look for foreigners, and where they would target the two backpackers. In the video of the killings, the attackers can be heard shouting "enemies of Allah", and "revenge for our brothers in Hajin".

Moroccan police later made additional arrests of individuals believed to have connections with the suspects.

Trial 
In total, 24 went on trial in Salé, near Rabat in Morocco. Of those charged, 23 suspects are Moroccans from Marrakesh, and one is a Swiss-Spanish Muslim convert. Three of them were charged with murder, and the other 23 of various terrorist charges.

In May 2019, one of the suspects admitted to killing one of the women. He had previously been jailed for having attempted to join the Islamic State in Syria, and was released in 2015.

In July 2019, three of the suspects were given a death sentence, which their lawyer said he would appeal.

Appeal 
On 31 October of 2019, the death sentence for three of the convicted was upheld by the anti-terrorist court in Salé. In total, 24 suspects connected to the murders, or whom were members of the jihadist cell, were sentenced.

The prime suspect, Abdessamad Ejjoud, was 25 years of age and organised the murder expedition with two accomplices, Younes Ouaziyad (27) and Rachid Afatti (33) who filmed the murders. A fourth suspect, Abderrahim Khayali, had his sentence elevated from life imprisonment to the death penalty. Khayali was part of the expedition into the mountain, but left the group before the killings. The court upheld received sentences from 5 to 30 years in prison for nineteen of the accused, and elevated one sentence from 15 to 20 years in prison. Ejjoud used his chance to speak before the sentence to ask for the death penalty, as he believed in neither the laws nor human rights. Ouaziyad and Afatti recited verses from the Quran.

Like in the first trial, the court ordered the four prime suspects to pay 190,000 euros to the parents of Maren Ueland.

The death penalty is still in effect in Morocco. In practice, no executions have taken place since 1993.

As of 2023, the suspects are still awaiting execution. On 28 February 2023, Abderrahmane Khayali committed suicide by hanging with a piece of cloth taken from his clothes anchored to a window, he was awaiting execution at the Oujda local prison.

Funerals 
The remains of the victims were flown to Copenhagen, Denmark on 21 December 2018.

Jespersen's funeral was held in her native town of Ikast, Denmark on 12 January. The Prime Minister of Denmark, Lars Løkke Rasmussen, attended the funeral.

Ueland was buried on 21 January in Jæren, Norway. The Norwegian Minister of Health, Bent Høie, and the Moroccan Ambassador, Lamia Radi, attended the ceremony.

Aftermath 
In Morocco, news of the attack was met with widespread outrage and condemnation. The incident received extensive coverage in the international press. Reactions in the native countries of the victims were of shock and outrage. A public torchlit vigil was held in Ueland's native town of Bryne in support of her family and loved ones.

Vigils for the victims were held in Rabat, Morocco at the embassies of Norway and Denmark, along with vigils in Marrakesh and Imlil.

Two videos, one depicting the murder, and another where the suspects filmed themselves swearing allegiance to ISIS, were published onto social media. Moroccan authorities and Norway's National Criminal Investigation Service agents have said the videos are authentic.

See also 
 Kayla Mueller – American activist and aid worker abducted by ISIS and later killed.

References

Further reading

2010s murders in Morocco
2018 crimes in Morocco
2018 murders in Africa
Attacks on tourists
Deaths by person in Africa
December 2018 crimes in Africa
December 2018 events in Africa
Denmark–Morocco relations
Female murder victims
Filmed killings
Incidents of violence against women
Islamic terrorist incidents in 2018
Islamism-related beheadings
Morocco–Norway relations
Stabbing attacks in 2018
Terrorist incidents in Morocco
Terrorist incidents in Morocco in 2018
Terrorist incidents involving knife attacks
Violence against women in Morocco